Spunk is a play by American playwright George C. Wolfe and is an adaptation of three stories by Zora Neale Hurston.  Wolfe won a 1989 Obie award for best off-Broadway director for Spunk.

External links
 

Plays by George C. Wolfe
1989 plays
Obie Award-winning plays
Adaptations of works by Zora Neale Hurston